Počaply is a municipality and village in Příbram District in the Central Bohemian Region of the Czech Republic. It has about 100 inhabitants.

Administrative parts
The village of Stražiště is an administrative part of Počaply.

References

Villages in Příbram District